Halorubrum californiense is a halophilic Archaeon in the family of Halorubraceae. It was isolated from saline environments solar saltern in Newark, California.

References

Euryarchaeota
Archaea described in 2008